Malappuram district is an education hub of the state of Kerala, India with four universities, two medical colleges, two law colleges and several engineering and arts colleges. 
The city has several educational institutions from the school level to higher education. Kendriya Vidyalaya, Jawahar Navodaya Vidyalaya, Malabar Special Police HSS, Government Girls Higher secondary school, Govt. Boys, St.Gemmas HSS, Islahiya HSS, A.U.P School, Sree Arunodaya Vidya Nigethan etc. to name a few schools. The city is lacking an Engineering College under Government despite having the largest number of students appearing and excelling in respective entrance exams. Govt. College, Malappuram, which is the oldest college in the city, started in 1972, College of Applied Science Malappuram and Govt. College for Women started this year along with many other private colleges serves the higher educational purpose. Govt.TTI and MCT TTI are few teachers training institutes. The Regional Directorate of Higher Secondary Education and Regional Office (Malabar) of State Open School are located in the city inside the Civil Station.

History
The Kerala school of astronomy and mathematics flourished between the 14th and 16th centuries. In attempting to solve astronomical problems, the Kerala school independently created a number of important mathematics concepts, including series expansion for trigonometric functions. The Kerala School of Astronomy and Mathematics was based at Vettathunadu (Tirur region).

Higher education hub
Malappuram is transforming to a higher education hub of the state with many multi-core projects under pipeline here. Air connectivity and business potential of the city and district is attracting many private business groups to invest at Malappuram.

List of Educational institutions in and around Malappuram

Overview

The progress that Malappuram district has achieved in the field of education during the last four decades is tremendous. Great strides have been made in the field of female education. The district plays a significant role in the higher education sector of the state. It is home to two of the main universities in the state- the University of Calicut centered at Tenhipalam which was established in 1968 as the second university in Kerala, and the Thunchath Ezhuthachan Malayalam University centered at Tirur which was established in the year 2012. AMU Malappuram Campus, one of the three off-campus centres of Aligarh Muslim University (AMU) is situated in Cherukara, which was established by the AMU in 2010. An off-campus of the English and Foreign Languages University functions at Panakkad. The district is also home to a subcentre of Kerala Agricultural University at Thavanur, and a subcentre of Sree Sankaracharya University of Sanskrit at Tirunavaya. The headquarters of Darul Huda Islamic University is at Chemmad, Tirurangadi. INKEL Greens at Malappuram provides an educational zone with the industrial zone. Eranad Knowledge City at Manjeri is a first of its kind project in the state. The MES College of Engineering, Kuttippuram, is the first established engineering college under the self financing sector in Kerala, an urban campus that extends more than a mile (1.6 km) alongside the Bharathappuzha river. The KCAET at Thavanur established in 1963, is the only agricultural engineering institute in the state. The Govt Ayurveda Research Institute for Mental Disease at Pottippara near Kottakkal is the only government Ayurvedic mental hospital in Kerala. It is also the first of its type under the public sector in the country. The Government of Kerala has proposed to establish one more university, Ayurveda University, at Kottakkal.

Universities
 The University of Calicut is in Thenjipalam
 Aligarh Muslim University Malappuram Centre is in Chelamala. 
 Thunchath Ezhuthachan Malayalam University is in Thunchan Parambu, Tirur
 English and Foreign Languages University Malappuram

Professional Colleges

Engineering colleges
Calicut University Institute of Engineering and Technology, Tenhipalam
Eranad Knowledge City Technical Campus (EKC), Cherukulam, Manjeri
Kelappaji College of Agricultural Engineering and Technology, Thavanur
MES College of Engineering, Kuttippuram
M.E.A. Engineering College, Vengoor, Perinthalmanna
Veda Vyasa Institute of Technology, Karadparamba, Malappuram
Cochin College of Engineering and Technology, Valanchery
MGM College of Engineering and Pharmaceutical Sciences, Valanchery

MBBS colleges
Government Medical College, Malappuram at Manjeri
 MES Medical College, Perinthalmanna

Dental colleges
 Educare Institute of Dental Sciences, Malappuram
 MES Dental College, Malappuram
 Malabar Dental College, Malappuram

Ayurvedic colleges
 Govt. Vaidyaratnam P S Varier Ayurveda College, Edarikode, Kottakkal, Malappuram

Architectural colleges
 Alsalama Institute of Architecture, Malappuram
 Devaki Amma's Guruvayurappan College of Architecture, Malappuram
 Eranad Knowledge City College of Architecture, Manjeri
 MES School of Architecture, Kuttippuram
 Talent Institute of Architecture, Malappuram
 Vedavyasa College of Architecture, Malappuram

Law Colleges
 Aligarh Muslim University, Malappuram Centre, Law Department 
 KMCT Law College, Kuttippuram
 MCT College of Legal Studies, Malappuram

Pharmacy Colleges
 Al Shifa College of Pharmacy, Perinthalmanna
 Devaki Amma Memorial College of Pharmacy, Malappuram
 Jamia Salafiya Pharmacy College, Pulikkal
 KMCT College of Pharmacy, Malappuram
 Moulana College of Pharmacy, Perinthalmanna

Nursing Colleges
 Al-Shifa College of Paramedical Sciences, Lemonvalley, Perinthalmanna
 Al-Shifa College of Nursing, Angadipuram, Perinthalmanna
 Almas College of Nursing, Puthoor, Kottakkal
 Al-Salama College of Optometry, Perinthalmanna
 College of Nursing, EMS Memorial Co-operative Hospital, Perinthalmanna
 College of Paramedical Sciences, EMS Memorial Co-op. Hospital, Perinthalmanna
 MES College of Nursing, Perinthalmanna
 MIMS College of Nursing, Vazhayur, Kondotty
 MIMS College of Allied Health sciences, Vazhayur, Kondotty
 Moulana College of Nursing, Angadipuram, Perinthalmanna
 Moulana College of Paramedical Sciences, Angadipuram, Perinthalmanna

Government Arts and Science Colleges
 Government Arts & Science College Nilambur, Pookottumpadam
 Government Arts and Science College Kondotty, Kuzhimanna
 Government Arts and Science College, Thavanur
 Government College, Malappuram
 Government College Mankada, Kolathur
 Govt Arts and Science College, Tanur
 Govt. College for Women, C.H.Mohammed Koya Educational Complex, Down Hill, Malappuram
 Pookoya Thangal Memorial Government College, Perinthalmanna
 Thunchan Memorial Government College, Vakkad, Tirur

Private arts and science colleges
 A I A College, Kuniyil
 A I W A College, Mongam
 Amal College of Advanced Studies, Nilambur
 Ambedkar College of Arts & Science, Wandoor
 Ansar Arabic College, Valavannur, Kalpakanchery
 D U A College, Vazhakkad
 Darunnajath Arabic College, Karuvarakundu
 EMEA College of Arts and Science, Kondotty
 M.E.S. Ponnani College, Ponnani
 MES Keveeyam College, Valanchery
 Dr. Gafoor Memorial MES Mampad College, Mampad
 Madeenathul Uloom Arabic College, Pulikkal
 Malabar College of Advanced Studies, Vengara
 Mar Thoma College, Chungathara, Nilambur
 N.S.S College, Manjeri
 PSMO College, Tirurangadi
 Sullamussalam Arabic College, Areekode
 Sullamussalam Science College, Areekode
 Korambayil Ahammed Haji Memorial Unity Women's College, Manjeri
 Parappanangadi Co-operative College, Parappanangadi
 Sahya Arts and Science College, Wandoor
 College of Applied Science Malappuram
 Priyadarshini College, Melmuri, Malappuram
 Ma'din Arts and Science College, Melmuri, Malappuram
 MIC Arts and Science College, Athanikal, Malappuram
 GEMS College, Ramapuram, Perinthalmanna
 Malappuram Cooperative College, Down hill, Malappuram
 HM College, Manjeri
 Farook Arts&Science College, Parappur, Kottakkal
 MAJLIS Arts and Science, Puramannur, Valanchery
 MES Arts and Science, Perinthalmanna
 Moulana College, Kootayi, Tirur
 Safa college of arts and science, Pookattiri, Valanchery
 CPA Arts and Science, Cheloor, Puthanathani

Polytechnic colleges
 S.S.M. Polytechnic College, Tirur
 Government Polytechnic College, Perinthalmanna
 Government Polytechnic College, Manjeri
 Government Polytechnic College, Tirurangadi
 Government Women's Polytechnic College, Kottakal
 Ma'din Polytechnic College, Malappuram
 NTTF Karathod, Malappuram
 NTTF Kuttippuram
 Orphanage Polytechnic College, Edavanna
 Malabar polytechnic College, Kottakkal

Optometry Institutes
Malabar Institute of Optometry, Kizhakethala, Malappuram
Vasan Eye Care IRIS Institute of Optometry, AK Road, Malappuram
Al Salama Optometry, Perinthalmanna
 Al Rayhan College of optometry, Kondotty

Schools
The district is home to the highest number of schools as well as students in the state. There are 898 Lower primary schools, 363 Upper primary schools, 355 High schools, 248 Higher secondary schools, and 27 Vocational Higher secondary schools in the district. Hence there are 1620 schools in the district. Besides these, there are 120 CBSE schools and 3 ICSE schools. 
554 government schools, 810 Aided schools, and 1 unaided school, recognised by the Government of Kerala have been digitalised.

Education cities

Inkel Greens

Inkel Greens, an educity under construction at picturesque 243 acres at Panakkad in the city is a PPP joint venture of Inkel and KSIDC subsidiary called Inkid. Once completed, the edu health city would have premier institutions like Institute of Engineering & Technology, International Business School, School of Media and Law, International Residential School, Finishing School, Hospitality and Residential Areas etc. Currently NTTF has started INKEL-NTTF Technical Training Centre offering Diploma courses in Electronics and Mechatronics and Institute of Gems and Jewellery offering various courses related to Jewellery field.  Many other institutions are also under construction in the premises and are expected to commence operation by 2016. Master plan of the educity is done by Indian studio of German firm BDP (Building Design Partnership).

Al Abeer Educity

Al Abeer Educity is another educational project underway at Malappuram promoted by Saudi-based Al abeer group. It is an 8 billion project comprising Medical College, Hospital, Business School, Institute of Engineering, International School, Health Spa etc. This 70+ acre project is getting established at Melmuri in the city. Medical College is expected to open by 2016.

Eranad Knowledge City
Eranad Knowledge City at Manjeri is a first of its kind project in the state. It is chain of professional colleges, other colleges, and schools based at Manjeri.

See also

 Education in Perinthalmanna
Administration of Malappuram
History of Malappuram
List of desoms in Malappuram (1981)
List of Gram Panchayats in Malappuram
List of people from Malappuram
List of villages in Malappuram
Transportation in Malappuram
Malappuram metropolitan area
Malappuram district
South Malabar

References

 
 
Kerala education-related lists